Sir Claude Howard Stanley Frankau CBE DSO FRCS (11 February 1883 – 29 June 1967) was a British surgeon. He was awarded the DSO in 1918, CBE in 1919 and knighted in 1945. 

Claude Frankau was the younger son of London barrister F. J. "Fritz" Frankau (1855–1933), and thus grandson of Adolph Frankau (1821–1860), a successful importer of smokers' requisites and founder of the pipe-manufacturing firm Adolph Frankau & Co.

His second wife was psychiatrist Dr Isabella Robertson.

References

External links
 "FRANKAU, Sir Claude (Howard Stanley)" in  Who Was Who, A & C Black, 1920–2008; online edn, Oxford University Press, Dec 2007 (accessed 7 June 2011) (Subscription required)
 

1883 births
1967 deaths
British surgeons
Commanders of the Order of the British Empire
Companions of the Distinguished Service Order
Fellows of the Royal College of Surgeons
Knights Bachelor
20th-century surgeons